The Phoenix Super LPG Fuel Masters is a professional basketball team owned by Phoenix Petroleum Philippines, Inc., which debuted in the Philippine Basketball Association (PBA) in the 2016 Commissioner's Cup. The franchise began after the company acquired the second Barako Bull team in January 2016.

History
In March 2011, Phoenix Petroleum Philippines, Inc., a sponsor of the PBA games, had expressed interest in acquiring a PBA franchise and were in talks to acquire the franchise of the original Barako Bull Energy Boosters team (owned by the Energy Food and Drink, Inc.). For the sale to proceed, a two-thirds approval from the PBA Board of Governors was needed (7 out of 10 votes). However, it failed to get the necessary number of votes. Reportedly, San Miguel Corporation (SMC) intended to rename its PBA team as the Petron Blaze Boosters for the 2011 PBA Governors Cup, hence its objection to the proposed entry of Phoenix Petroleum, a business competitor of Petron, in 2011. SMC reverted to playing as the San Miguel Beermen in 2014.

In July 2011, the PBA franchise of the original Barako Bull Energy Boosters was acquired by the Lina Group of Companies, owner of the original Air21 Express team, reportedly for 50 million pesos. The franchise went on to play as the Shopinas.com Clickers and, later, as the second Air21 Express team. In June 2014, the Lina Group sold this franchise to Manila North Tollways Corporation and became the NLEX Road Warriors.

The Start Of Fuel Masters

In January 2016, Phoenix Petroleum Philippines, Inc. sealed a deal to acquire the team known as the second Barako Bull team (also known as the original Air21 Express team) from the Lina Group, reportedly in the amount of 100 million pesos. The PBA board of governors unanimously approved the sale on January 20, 2016. In addition, the board also gave its approval for Phoenix Petroleum to play in the 2016 PBA Commissioner's Cup instead of waiting until the 2016–17 PBA season. The coaching staff, players' contracts and contractual obligations will be carried over by the new owners.

On February 10, 2016, the Phoenix Fuel Masters officially announced their entry into the PBA with a press conference, followed by the unveiling of their new uniforms, held at Novotel Manila in Araneta Center, Cubao. The Fuel Masters debuted in the PBA with a 118–106 win over the NLEX Road Warriors at the 2016 PBA Commissioner's Cup, with Nigerian Kenny Adeleke as import. After four games, he was waived and Kevinn Pinkney took his place as the team reinforcement.

On May 31, 2016, Phoenix announced the appointment of Westports Malaysia Dragons head coach Ariel Vanguardia as the new head coach of the team. He will take over the position formerly occupied by Banal.

Current roster

Players of note

 Yutien Andrada
 Cyrus Baguio
 Mac Baracael
 Ronjay Buenafe
 Mark Borboran
 Rodney Brondial
 Prince Caperal
 Jeff Chan
 Mark Cruz
 Simon Enciso
 James Forrester
 Jeric Fortuna
 RR Garcia
 Marvin Hayes
 JC Intal
 Jens Knuttel
 Chico Lanete
 Michael Miranda
 Emman Monfort
 Mick Pennisi
 Paul Sorongon
 Norbert Torres
 Josh Urbiztondo
 John Wilson
 Willy Wilson
 Jonathan Uyloan

Imports 
  Richard Howell 
  Kenny Adeleke
  Lee Kwan Hee
  Eugene Phelps
  Kevinn Pinkney
  Marcus Simmons
  Brandon Brown

Front Office

Coaches

Season-by-season records

Records from the 2022–23 PBA season:

*one-game playoff**team had the twice-to-beat advantage

See also
 Phoenix Super LPG Fuel Masters draft history

References

 
2016 establishments in the Philippines
Basketball teams established in 2016